BNP Paribas Personal Finance UK, formerly known as LaSer UK, is a provider of consumer finance. It operates in the UK and in the Republic of Ireland.  The company administers credit and loyalty programmes for businesses across multiple sectors, including retail, household, insurance, entertainment and leisure. BNP Paribas Personal Finance manages four million customers and 300 UK partnerships, and in 2016 financed £1.6 billion in credit.

The company's operations are in Solihull and Belfast, where it employs 740 people.

BNP Paribas Personal Finance consists of two separate companies: Creation Financial Services Limited and Creation Consumer Finance Limited, collectively trading under the name of Creation.

BNP Paribas Personal Finance is fully owned by the France-based BNP Paribas.

History 
The company began its existence in 1973 as the financial services arm of Selfridges. The company eventually became SearsCard, with its primary function to provide store card facilities for retail companies within the Sears PLC Group.

In the late nineties, the company was rebranded as Creation Financial Services Ltd.

In 1999, Creation Financial Services Ltd. was acquired by LaSer, a European provider of credit and loyalty customer programmes based in Paris, jointly owned by BNP Paribas and Galeries Lafayette.

In 2004, Creation expanded into co-brand credit cards with the launch of a number of programmes with football clubs, providing credit cards to clubs in the Premiership and Football League Championship.

In 2006, Creation acquired Belfast-based Open and Direct Retail Services (ODRS).

In 2007, the LaSer Group was formed by Creation’s parents, including rebranding the group companies across Europe and LaSer UK was formed.

In 2008, LaSer UK in-sourced its customer services and collections teams.

In 2010 LaSer UK announced it would be supplying fixed term credit for DSG International the owners of Dixons, Currys and PC World.

In 2012 LaSer UK announced a partnership with retailer Asda, to provide the Asda Money Credit Card. The new partnership created 100 new jobs at LaSer UK's Solihull call centre.

In 2017 LaSer UK rebranded itself as BNP Paribas Personal Finance UK.

Products 
BNP Paribas Personal Finance provides consumer finance including retail point of sale finance, credit cards, affinity loans and insurance premium finance.

In late 2012 Creation Financial Services redeveloped and relaunched their total Online Servicing suite for Card, ensuring that this was a key servicing channel for their customer base.

References 

Financial services companies established in 1973
Companies based in Solihull
1973 establishments in England
BNP Paribas